Govind Das Richharia (26 February 1920 – 18 March 1996) was an Indian politician who was a leader of Indian National Congress. He was member of the Fifth Lok Sabha  representing the Jhansi of Uttar Pradesh. He also served as a member of the Uttar Pradesh Vidhan Sabha from 1980 to 1985.

Richharia died on 18 March 1996, at the age of 76.

References

1920 births
1996 deaths
Lok Sabha members from Uttar Pradesh
India MPs 1971–1977
People from Jhansi district
Uttar Pradesh MLAs 1980–1985
Bharatiya Janata Party politicians from Uttar Pradesh